Alfacalcidol (or 1-hydroxycholecalciferol) is an analogue of vitamin D used for supplementation in humans and as a poultry feed additive.

Alfacalcidol has a weaker impact on calcium metabolism and parathyroid hormone levels than calcitriol, however alfacalcidol has significant effects on the immune system, including regulatory T cells. It is considered to be a more useful form of vitamin D supplementation, mostly due to much longer half-life and lower kidney load. It is the most commonly prescribed vitamin D metabolite for patients with end stage renal disease, given that impaired renal function alters the ability to carry out the second hydroxylation step required for the formation of the physiologically active form of vitamin D, 1,25-dihydroxyvitamin D3. Alfacalcidol is an active vitamin D3 metabolite, and therefore does not require the second hydroxylation step in the kidney.

It was patented in 1971 and approved for medical use in 1978.

Trade names
Pharmaceutical trade names include AlphaD and One-Alpha.

Other animals
Used as a poultry feed additive, it prevents tibial dyschondroplasia and increases phytate bioavailability.

References 

Secosteroids
Vitamin D
Vinylidene compounds